Roberto Eduardo da Silva is a former Hong Kong international lawn bowler.

Bowls career
He was born in 1932 to Portuguese parents and won a bronze medal in the fours with Saco Delgado and Abdul Kitchell at the 1972 World Outdoor Bowls Championship in Worthing.

Either side of the World Championship he won two Commonwealth Games gold medals. In 1970 he was part of the four that won the gold medal at the 1970 British Commonwealth Games in Edinburgh and eight years later repeated the success at the 1978 Commonwealth Games in Edmonton.

Personal life
He was a banking official by trade.

References

1931 births
Living people
Hong Kong male bowls players
Commonwealth Games medallists in lawn bowls
Commonwealth Games gold medallists for Hong Kong
Bowls players at the 1978 Commonwealth Games
Bowls players at the 1970 British Commonwealth Games
Medallists at the 1970 British Commonwealth Games
Medallists at the 1978 Commonwealth Games